Eucalyptus socialis subsp. socialis, commonly known as the summer red mallee, is a subspecies of mallee that is endemic to inland south-eastern Australia. It usually has rough bark on the base of the trunk, smooth bark above, lance-shaped adult leaves, flower buds in groups of between seven and eleven, pale creamy white flowers and barrel-shaped to urn-shaped or spherical fruit.

Description
It usually has rough, stringy to fibrous or flaky bark at the base of the trunk, smooth dull grey to cream-coloured bark above.

Taxonomy and naming
Eucalyptus socialis subsp. socialis was first formally described in 2005 by Dean Nicolle in Australian Systematic Botany.

Distribution and habitat
Summer red mallee grows in mallee, often on calcareous soils and with other eucalypts, including E. dumosa, E. gracilis, E. oleosa and E. porosa. It is found in the drier parts of the south-east of South Australia, to north-western Victoria and as far east as Nyngan in New South Wales.

References 

socialis
Myrtales of Australia
Flora of New South Wales
Flora of South Australia
Flora of Victoria (Australia)
Plants described in 2005